Rabbi Meshulam Nahari (born 7 May 1951) is an Israeli politician. He served as a member of the Knesset for Shas in two spells between 1999 and 2021.

Biography
Meshullam Nahari was born in Jerusalem to Yemenite Jewish immigrant parents, and studied in a yeshiva. After his national service, he was ordained as a rabbi, and also gained a BA from Lifschitz Teaching College. After graduating, he went on to become a headteacher. Nahari is married, with five children, and lives in Jerusalem.

Public service
Nahari served as a consultant to the Deputy Minister of Education and was a member of the Education Ministry directorate. Later he was appointed Director of the ministry's Haredi Culture Department.

Political career
Nahari was first elected to the Knesset in the 1999 elections, and served as Deputy Minister of Education under both Ehud Barak and Ariel Sharon.

He retained his seat in both the 2003 and 2006 elections, and was made a Minister without Portfolio in Ehud Olmert's government. In September 2006, he was given a position in the Finance Ministry, with responsibilities for education and welfare. After his appointment, he proposed a bill which would require local authorities to fund unrecognised ultra-Orthodox schools, which was passed despite opposition from the Attorney General and the Education Minister Yuli Tamir.

Nahari retained his seat again in the 2009 elections, having been placed fifth on the Shas list, and was appointed a Minister without Portfolio again. He was re-elected again in 2013, but Shas were excluded from the coalition government. After another re-election in 2015, he was appointed Deputy Minister of Welfare and Social Services in the new government formed in May 2015. In January 2016, he was moved to the Deputy Minister of the Interior portfolio. Later in the month, he resigned from the Knesset to allow Yigal Guetta to become an MK, but remained a deputy minister under the Norwegian Law. Nahari resigned from his position shortly after Guetta's resignation from the Knesset, and returned on 20 September 2017, to his place in the Knesset in accordance to the Norwegian Law, replacing Danny Saida. A week later he was reinstated as deputy minister.

References

External links

1951 births
Living people
Deputy ministers of Israel
Government ministers of Israel
Israeli civil servants
Israeli educators
Israeli Orthodox rabbis
Israeli people of Yemeni-Jewish descent
Jewish Israeli politicians
Members of the 15th Knesset (1999–2003)
Members of the 16th Knesset (2003–2006)
Members of the 17th Knesset (2006–2009)
Members of the 18th Knesset (2009–2013)
Members of the 19th Knesset (2013–2015)
Members of the 20th Knesset (2015–2019)
Members of the 21st Knesset (2019)
Members of the 22nd Knesset (2019–2020)
Members of the 23rd Knesset (2020–2021)
People from Jerusalem
Rabbinic members of the Knesset
Shas politicians